The Burke Ministry was the ministry of the sixth Chief Minister of the Northern Territory, Denis Burke. It was sworn in on 9 February 1999, following the resignation of former Chief Minister Shane Stone the previous day. While Stone told the media that his resignation was "pretty much" of his own timing and he wished to give the new CLP leader sufficient time to prepare for the 2001 election, it followed a meeting of backbenchers and some cabinet ministers advocating his removal. Burke was elected unopposed as leader. It was in office until 26 August 2001, when the Burke government lost the 2001 election to Clare Martin's Labor Party.

First ministry (9 February 1999 – 3 August 1999)

The new ministry saw a few main changes apart from the leadership, with Eric Poole leaving the Ministry and Stephen Dunham and Loraine Braham being added, while Tim Baldwin was promoted. It operated until 3 August 1999, when Chris Lugg was promoted to the Ministry to replace Barry Coulter, who had retired on 18 June 1999.

 On 18 June 1999, Barry Coulter retired from politics and resigned from the Ministry. On 21 June 1999, the Chief Minister and Deputy Chief Minister divided his portfolios.

  (under "A New Chief Minister")

Second ministry (4 August 1999 – 30 January 2000)

The Second Burke Ministry was the 40th ministry to come from the Northern Territory Legislative Assembly. It was sworn in on 4 August 1999, following the promotion of Chris Lugg to the Ministry to replace Barry Coulter who had resigned from Parliament. It operated until 30 January 2000.

Third ministry (31 January 2000 – 26 August 2001)

The Third Burke Ministry was the 41st ministry to come from the Northern Territory Legislative Assembly. It was sworn in on 30 January 2000, and operated until 26 August 2001, and was succeeded by the First Martin Ministry after the Labor Party's victory in the 2001 election.

 On 25 November 2000, in what was described as a completely unexpected move, the Country Liberal Party denied sitting member Loraine Braham preselection for her Braitling seat. Braham, who was "utterly stunned" by the decision, was replaced immediately as a minister with Dr Richard Lim.

  (under "Arrivals and Departures")

References

Northern Territory ministries